Peace Scouts may refer to:
 Peace Scouts, the original name for GirlGuiding New Zealand
 Peace Scouts of California, an early group engaged in Scouting in the United States
 National Peace Scouts, also known as British Boy Scouts and British Girl Scouts Association
 Peace Boy Scouts, another name for Ragazzi Esploratori Italiani, an early group engaged in Scouting and Guiding in Italy